Nemourinae is a subfamily of stoneflies in the family Nemouridae. There are at least 40 described species in Nemourinae.

Genera
 Lednia Ricker, 1952
 Nemoura Latreille, 1796
 Ostrocerca Ricker, 1952
 Paranemoura Needham & Claassen, 1925
 Podmosta Ricker, 1952
 Prostoia Ricker, 1952
 Shipsa Ricker, 1952
 Soyedina Ricker, 1952
 Visoka Ricker, 1952
 Zapada'' Ricker, 1952

References

Further reading

External links
 NCBI Taxonomy Browser, Nemourinae

Nemouridae
Insect subfamilies